Burton Swifts Football Club was a football club based in Burton upon Trent, England. Established in 1871, the club joined the Football League in 1892, remaining members until merging with Burton Wanderers to form Burton United in 1901.

History
Burton Swifts F.C. were formed in 1871. In 1890, the club became a founder member of the Combination. However, after only a year they switched to the Football Alliance. When the Alliance merged with The Football League in 1892, the club were founder members of the Second Division of the League.

The club was not very successful, and never finished higher than sixth in their division. After finishing bottom of the Second Division in 1900–01 season the club merged with neighbours Burton Wanderers to form Burton United. The new club took Swifts' place in the League and played at their Peel Croft ground.

References

External links

Burton United Historical kits

 
Defunct football clubs in England
Defunct English Football League clubs
Defunct football clubs in Staffordshire
Association football clubs established in 1871
Association football clubs disestablished in 1901
Borough of East Staffordshire
1871 establishments in England
1901 disestablishments in England